The Battle of the Sakarya, also known as the Battle of the Sangarios, was an important engagement in the Greco-Turkish War (1919–1922).

The battle went on for 21 days from August 23 to September 13, 1921, close to the banks of the Sakarya River in the immediate vicinity of Polatlı, which is today a district of the Ankara Province. The battle line stretched over 62 miles (100 km).

It is also known as the Officers' Battle in Turkey because of the unusually high casualty rate (70–80%) among the officers. Later, it was also called Melhâme-i Kübrâ (Islamic equivalent to Armageddon) by Kemal Atatürk.

The Battle of the Sakarya is considered as the turning point of the Turkish War of Independence. The Turkish observer, writer, and literary critic İsmail Habip Sevük later described the importance of the battle with these words:

Background
The Greek offensive, under King Constantine I as Supreme Commander of the Greek Forces in Asia, was committed on July 16, 1921 and skilfully executed. A feint towards the Turkish right flank at Eskişehir distracted Ismet Pasha just as the major assault fell on the left at Kara Hisar. The Greeks then wheeled their axis to the north, swept towards Eskişehir and rolled up the Turkish defence in a series of frontal assaults that was combined with flanking movements.

Eskişehir fell on July 17 despite a vigorous counterattack by Ismet Pasha, who was determined to fight to the finish. The saner counsels of Mustafa Kemal prevailed, however, and Ismet disengaged with great losses to reach the comparative safety of the Sakarya River, some 30 mi (48 km) to the north and only 50 miles (80 km) from Ankara.

The determining feature of the terrain was the river itself, which flows eastward across the plateau, suddenly curves north and then turns back westwards. The great loop described forms a natural barrier. The river banks are awkward and steep, and bridges were few with only two on the frontal section of the loop. East of the loop, the landscape rises before an invader in rocky, barren ridges and hills towards Ankara. It was in those hills, east of the river that the Turks dug in their defensive positions. The front followed the hills east of the Sakarya River from a point near Polatlı southwards to the place at which the Gök River joins the Sakarya, and then swung at rightangles eastwards following the line of the Gök River. That was an excellent defensive ground.

For the Greeks, the question on whether to dig in and rest on their previous gains or to advance towards Ankara in great effort and destroy the Army of the Grand National Assembly. That was difficult to resolve and posed the eternal problems with which the Greek staff had to deal since the beginning of the war. The dangers of extending the lines of communications still further in such an inhospitable terrain that killed horses, caused vehicles to break down and prevented the movement of heavy artillery were obvious. The present front that gave the Greeks the control of the essential strategic railway was tactically most favourable, but the Army of the Grand National Assembly had escaped encirclement at Kütahya and so nothing had been settled. That made the temptation of achieving a knockout blow become irresistible.

Battle

On August 10, Greek King Constantine I finally committed his forces to an assault against the Sakarya Line. The Greeks marched hard for nine days before they made contact with the enemy. The march included an outflanking manoeuvre through the northern part of Anatolia through the Salt Desert, where food and water scarcely existed and so the advancing infantry foraged the poor Turkish villages for maize and water or meat from the flocks that were pastured on the fringe of the desert.

On August 23, battle was finally joined by the Greeks making contact with the advanced Turkish positions south of the Gök River. The Turkish General Staff had made its headquarters at Polatlı, on the railway a few miles east of the coast of the Sakarya River, and its troops were prepared to resist.

On August 26, the Greeks attacked all along the line. Crossing the shallow Gök, the infantry fought its way step up onto the heights, where every ridge and hill top had to be stormed against strong entrenchments and withering fire.

By September 2, the commanding heights of the key Mount Chal were in Greek hands, but once the enveloping movement against the Turkish left flank had failed, the battle descended to a typical head-on confrontation of infantry, machine guns and artillery. The Greeks launched their main effort in the centre and pushed forward some 10 mi (16 km) in 10 days through the Turks' second line of defence. Some Greek units came as close as 31 mi (50 km) to the city of Ankara. That was the peak of their achievement in the Asia Minor Campaign.

For days during the battle, neither ammunition nor food had reached the front because  of the successful harassment of the Greek lines of communications and the raids behind the Greek lines by Turkish cavalry. All of the Greek troops were committed to the battle, but fresh Turkish draftees were still arriving throughout the campaign in response to the Turkish National Movement's mobilisation. All of those causes ended the impetus of the Greek attack. For a few days, there was a lull in the fighting during which neither of the exhausted armies could press an attack. Constantine, who commanded the battle personally, was almost taken prisoner by a Turkish patrol.

Astute as ever at the decisive moment, Mustafa Kemal assumed personal command and led a small counterattack against the Greek left, around Mount Chal, on September 8. The Greek line held, and the attack itself achieved a limited military success, but fear that presaged a major Turkish effort to outflank their forces while the severity of the winter was approaching made Constantine break off the Greek assault on September 14, 1921.

That made Anastasios Papoulas order a general retreat toward Eskişehir and Afyonkarahisar. The Greek troops evacuated Mount Chal, which had been taken at such a cost, and they retired unmolested across the Sakarya River to the positions that they had left a month earlier and took their guns and equipment with them. In the line of the retreating army, nothing was left that could benefit the Turks. Railways and bridges were blown up, and villages were burnt in the scorched-earth policy.

After the Greek retreat, the Turkish forces managed to retake Sivrihisar on September 20, Aziziye on September 22 and Bolvadin and Çay on September 24.

Aftermath

The retreat from Sakarya marked the end of the Greeks' hopes to impose a settlement on Turkey by the force of arms. In May 1922, Papoulas and his complete staff resigned and was replaced by General Georgios Hatzianestis, who proved much more inept than his predecessor.

On the other hand, Mustafa Kemal returned to Ankara, where the Grand National Assembly awarded him the rank of Field Marshal of the Army and the title of Gazi to render its honours as the saviour of the Turkish nation.

According to the speech that was delivered years later before the same National Assembly at the Second General Conference of the Republican People's Party, which took part from October 15 to 20, 1927, Kemal was said to have ordered that "not an inch of the country should be abandoned until it was drenched with the blood of the citizens" once he realised that the Turkish Army was losing ground rapidly and that virtually no natural defences were left between the battle line and Ankara.

Lord Curzon argued that the military situation became a stalemate with time tending favour the Turks. Their reputation by the British was improving. In his opinion, the Turkish nationalists were then more ready to negotiate.

The Ankara government then signed the Treaty of Kars with the Russians and the most important Treaty of Ankara with the French, which reduced the enemy's front notably in the Cilician theatre and allowed it to concentrate against the Greeks to the west.

For the Turkish troops, the battle was the turning point of the war, which would develop in a series of important military clashes against the Greeks and drive the invaders out of Asia Minor during the Turkish War of Independence. The Greeks could do nothing but fight to secure their retreat. On August 26, the Turkish offensive started with Battle of Dumlupınar. Kemal dispatched his army on a drive to the coast of the Aegean Sea to pursue the  Greek Army. That would culminate in the direct assault of Smyrna from September 9 to 11, 1922.

The war ended by the withdrawal of the Greeks from Asia Minor, as would be formalised by the Treaty of Lausanne, on 24 July 1923.

Gallery

See also
First Battle of İnönü
Second Battle of İnönü
Mehmetçik Monument

Notes

References

Bibliography

See also
Order of battle for the Battle of Sakarya

Conflicts in 1921
Sakarya 1921
Angora vilayet
1921 in the Ottoman Empire
1921 in Greece
History of Sakarya Province
August 1921 events
September 1921 events
Battles of Mustafa Kemal Atatürk
Battles of İsmet İnönü